The speaker of the Indiana State House of Representatives is the highest official in the Indiana House of Representatives, customarily elected from the ranks of the majority party. As in most Anglophone countries and provinces, the speaker presides over the lower house of the legislature.

The current speaker is Todd Huston.

List of speakers of the Indiana House of Representatives

See also

Indiana House of Representatives
Indiana General Assembly

References

External links
 Complete list of Speakers of the Indiana House of Representatives

 
Indiana
Speakers